Rancheros Creek is a tributary stream of the Sabinal River, in Medina County and Uvalde County, Texas.

Rancheros Creek runs 26 miles from its source in hills 10 miles south of Uvalde, Texas.  It runs southeast for a few miles being joined from the left bank by Comanche Creek, then to Comanche Waterhole where it has its confluence with Little Comanche Creek before turning to the southwest and running to its confluence with the Sabinal River, four miles south of Sabinal.  Midway on this reach of the creek Elm Creek joins it from the right bank southeast of Sabinal.

Rancheros Creek was a watering place for travelers on the San Antonio-El Paso Road including the stagecoach lines like the San Antonio-El Paso Mail and San Antonio-San Diego Mail Line.

See also
List of rivers of Texas

References

Rivers of Texas
Rivers of Uvalde County, Texas
Bodies of water of Medina County, Texas
San Antonio–El Paso Road
San Antonio–San Diego Mail Line
Stagecoach stops in the United States